Edward Roscoe Meek (December 23, 1865 – April 10, 1939) was a United States district judge of the United States District Court for the Northern District of Texas.

Education and career

Born in Davenport, Iowa, Meek received an Artium Baccalaureus degree from the University of Iowa in 1887, a Bachelor of Laws from the University of Iowa College of Law in 1889, and an Artium Magister degree from the University of Iowa in 1891. He was in private practice in Fort Worth, Texas from 1889 to 1898.

Federal judicial service

Meek received a recess appointment from President William McKinley on July 13, 1898, to the United States District Court for the Northern District of Texas, to a new seat authorized by 30 Stat. 240. He was nominated to the same position by President McKinley on December 13, 1898. He was confirmed by the United States Senate on February 15, 1899, and received his commission the same day. He assumed senior status on December 31, 1935. His service terminated on April 10, 1939, due to his death in Santa Monica, California. Meek was McKinley's longest serving judicial appointee and the last in active service.

References

Sources
 

1865 births
1939 deaths
Judges of the United States District Court for the Northern District of Texas
United States federal judges appointed by William McKinley
University of Iowa alumni
University of Iowa College of Law alumni
Texas lawyers
People from Davenport, Iowa